Tornoceratina is one of two suborders included in the Goniatitida, characterized by generally involute, subdiscoidal shells and by sutures in which the ventral ones are undivided.

Sutural lobes increase in number during the course of life of the individual, typically developed from the internal and external saddles. The siphuncle is prochoanitic, with septal necks projecting forward.

Derivation  is from the Anarcestida in the middle Devonian.

References
 Miller, Furnish, and Schindewolf, 1957. Paleozoic Ammonoidea. Treastise on Invertebrate Paleontology, Part L. Geological Society of America. 
 Tornoceratina in Goniat on line, Mar. 5, 2015
 The Paleobiology Database Oct.1, 2007

  
Goniatitida
Middle Devonian first appearances
Guadalupian extinctions